Phyllonorycter ringoniella is a moth of the family Gracillariidae. It is known from Japan (Hokkaido and Honshu), China, Korea and the Russian Far East.

The wingspan is 6.5-7.5 mm.

The larvae feed on Malus pumila, Malus baccata, Malus domestica, Malus mandshurica, Malus sieboldii, Malus toringo, Prunus avium, Prunus salicina and Pyrus species. They mine the leaves of their host plant. The mine is ptychonomous and located on the space between two veins of the lower surface of the leaf.

References

ringoniella
Moths of Asia
Moths described in 1931